de Vico is the name of several comets discovered by Father Francesco de Vico, a Jesuit priest.

See also 
 54P/de Vico-Swift-NEAT, discovered 1844 August 23
 122P/de Vico, discovered 1846 February 20
 C/1845 D1 (de Vico)
 C/1846 B1 (de Vico)
 C/1846 O1 (de Vico-Hind)
 C/1846 S1 (de Vico)

References

 NASA JPL database of comet orbital elements

Comets
1840s in science